SN9 may refer to :
 S9 (ZVV), an overnight service line  on the Zürich transportation networt
 SN9, a high-altitude prototype of the SpaceX Starship program.